The Gambia National Olympic Committee (IOC code: GAM) is the National Olympic Committee representing the Gambia. It is also the body responsible for the Gambia's representation at the Olympic Games.

The Gambia National Olympic Committee is also The Gambia's Commonwealth Games Association as well.

History 
The Gambia National Olympic Committee was founded in 1972 and recognised by the International Olympic Committee in 1976.

See also
The Gambia at the Commonwealth Games
The Gambia at the Olympics

References

External links
 Official website

The Gambia
The Gambia
Oly
The Gambia at the Commonwealth Games
The Gambia at the Olympics
Sports organizations established in 1976